Shaquille Moosa (born 10 April 2002) is a Zambian swimmer. He competed in the men's 50 metre freestyle at the 2020 Summer Olympics.

References

External links
 

2002 births
Living people
Zambian male freestyle swimmers
Olympic swimmers of Zambia
Swimmers at the 2020 Summer Olympics
Place of birth missing (living people)